Rong or RONG may refer to:

Places

China 
Rong County, Guangxi, Yulin, Guangxi, China
Rong County, Sichuan, Zigong, Sichuan, China

Nepal
Rong, Ilam, a rural municipality in Ilam District, Nepal

Norway 
Rong, Norway, a village in Øygarden municipality in Vestland county
Rongøy, an island in Øygarden municipality in Vestland county

People
Consort Rong (Kangxi) (died 1727), a consort of the Kangxi Emperor
Consort Rong (Qianlong) (1734–1788), a consort of the Qianlong Emperor, China
Prince Rong (1644–1912), a peerage during the Manchu-led Qing dynasty, China
Rong (surname)
Several ancient Chinese nomadic people
Xirong (西戎), West Rong
Shanrong (山戎), Mountain Rong
Quanrong (犬戎), Dog Rong

Other uses 
Róng or Lepcha script
Rong (crater), on Mars
 Rồng, a Vietnamese dragon

See also
Rong County (disambiguation)
Rong River (disambiguation)
Rongan (disambiguation)